Gdańsk Wrzeszcz railway station is a railway station serving the city of Gdańsk, in the Pomeranian Voivodeship, Poland. The station opened in 1870 and is located on the Gdańsk–Stargard railway, the parallel Gdańsk Śródmieście–Rumia railway and Gdańsk Wrzeszcz–Gdańsk Osowa railway. The station is located in the Wrzeszcz quarter of the city. The train services are operated by PKP, Przewozy Regionalne and SKM Tricity. Koleje Mazowieckie trains operate here during the summer.

General information
The station was built and opened in 1870 as part of a new railway line from Szczecin to Gdansk. This was the third established railway line in Gdansk (the line Gdańsk-Tczew and the railway line No. 249 to the Port).

On 2 January 1952 the SKM Trojmiasto suburban railway was opened, parallel to the existing line.

The station features three island platforms, of which one functions as the regional commuter SKM stop and the other for long-distance services and the Pomorska Kolej Metropolitalna services. The platforms are accessible through two underpasses which connect all six platforms. The ticket offices are open all day long.

The station used to be known as Danzig Langfuhr during Free City of Danzig era.

Signal box
In the early twentieth century (circa 1913) on the railway embankment a control room Gantry was built, the only one of its kind in northern Poland. Architects incorporated into it in the eclectic style of the district. In May 2015, in the face of intention to demolish this unique object by PKP (in all of Poland there are only 5 such signal boxes, all others are located in the Upper Silesia), it was added to the register of monuments.

Station building
The current station building opened on 8 March 1969. This station was completely renovated during 2014 and 2015 and officially re-opened in June 2015. Since October 2016, the station offers direct access to Galeria Metropolia shopping centre; the station is also within walking distance of Galeria Bałtycka shopping centre (pl), opened in 2007.

History
The old red brick station building can still be seen near the bus stops, where it has been converted to residential flats. A very similar station building is still operational at the Gdańsk Oliwa railway station.

Train services
The station is served by the following services:

EuroCity services (EC) (EC 95 by DB) (IC by PKP) Gdynia - Gdansk - Bydgoszcz - Poznan - Rzepin - Frankfurt (Oder) - Berlin
EuroCity services (EC) Gdynia - Gdansk - Malbork - Warsaw - Katowice - Bohumin - Ostrava - Prerov - Breclav - Vienna
Express Intercity Premium services (EIP) Gdynia - Warsaw
Express Intercity Premium services (EIP) Gdynia - Warsaw - Katowice - Gliwice/Bielsko-Biała
Express Intercity Premium services (EIP) Gdynia/Kołobrzeg - Warsaw - Kraków (- Rzeszów)
Intercity services (IC) Gdynia - Gdansk - Bydgoszcz - Poznań - Wrocław - Opole - Katowice - Kraków - Rzeszów - Przemyśl
Intercity services (IC) Gdynia - Gdańsk - Bydgoszcz - Toruń - Kutno - Łódź - Częstochowa - Katowice - Bielsko-Biała
Intercity services (IC) Gdynia - Gdańsk - Bydgoszcz - Łódź - Czestochowa — Krakow — Zakopane
Intercity services (IC) Gdynia - Gdańsk - Bydgoszcz - Poznań - Zielona Góra
Intercity services (IC) Gdynia - Gdańsk - Bydgoszcz - Poznań - Wrocław 
 Intercity services (IC) Łódź Fabryczna — Warszawa — Gdańsk Glowny — Kołobrzeg
Intercity services (IC) Szczecin - Koszalin - Słupsk - Gdynia - Gdańsk
Intercity services (IC) Szczecin - Koszalin - Słupsk - Gdynia - Gdańsk - Elbląg/Iława - Olsztyn
Intercity services (IC) Szczecin - Koszalin - Słupsk - Gdynia - Gdańsk - Elbląg - Olsztyn - Białystok
Intercity services (TLK) Gdynia Główna — Kostrzyn 
Intercity services (TLK) Gdynia Główna — Warszawa — Krakow — Zakopane 
Intercity services (TLK) Kołobrzeg — Gdynia Główna — Warszawa Wschodnia — Kraków Główny
Regional services (R) Tczew — Gdynia Chylonia 
Regional services (R) Tczew — Słupsk  
Regional services (R) Malbork — Słupsk  
Regional services (R) Malbork — Gdynia Chylonia 
Regional services (R) Elbląg — Gdynia Chylonia 
Regional services (R) Elbląg — Słupsk  
Regional services (R) Chojnice — Tczew — Gdynia Główna 
Regional services (R) Gdynia Chylonia — Olsztyn Główny
Regional services (R) Gdynia Chylonia — Smętowo 
Regional services (R) Gdynia Chylonia — Laskowice Pomorskie 
Regional services (R) Gdynia Chylonia — Bydgoszcz Główna 
Regional services (R) Słupsk — Bydgoszcz Główna 
Regional services (R) Gdynia Chylonia — Pruszcz Gdański 
Pomorska Kolej Metropolitalna services (R) Gdynia Główna — Gdańsk Osowa — Gdańsk Port Lotniczy (Airport) — Gdańsk Wrzeszcz
Pomorska Kolej Metropolitalna services (R) Kartuzy — Gdańsk Port Lotniczy (Airport) — Gdańsk Główny 
Pomorska Kolej Metropolitalna services (R) Kościerzyna — Gdańsk Port Lotniczy (Airport) — Gdańsk Wrzeszcz — Gdynia Główna
Szybka Kolej Miejska w Trójmieście services (SKM) (Lębork  -) Wejherowo - Reda - Rumia - Gdynia - Sopot - Gdansk

References 

 This article is based upon a translation of the Polish language version as of October 2016.

Railway stations in Poland opened in 1870
Wrzeszcz
Railway stations served by Szybka Kolej Miejska (Tricity)
Railway stations served by Przewozy Regionalne InterRegio